Yes Gumi FC is a South Korean professional futsal club based in Gumi, Gyeongsangbuk-do. The club was founded in October 2009.

References

Futsal clubs in South Korea
Sports teams in North Gyeongsang Province
Futsal clubs established in 2009
2009 establishments in South Korea